End of a Rainbow is the debut album by American vocalist and songwriter Patti Austin recorded in 1976 and released on the CTI label.

Track listing
All compositions by Patti Austin except where noted
 "Say You Love Me" – 5:45   
 "In My Life" – 4:18   
 "You Don't Have to Say You're Sorry" – 3:37   
 "More Today Than Yesterday" (Patrick Upton) – 5:29
 "Give It Time" – 3:07   
 "There Is No Time" – 3:28   
 "What's at the End of a Rainbow" – 2:50   
 "This Side of Heaven" – 3:03   
 "Sweet Sadie the Savior" – 6:25

Personnel
Patti Austin – vocals
Randy Brecker – trumpet
Michael Brecker, Joe Farrell – tenor saxophone
Ronnie Cuber – baritone saxophone
Richard Tee – clavinet
Michael Abene – piano
Barry Miles – synthesizer
Eric Gale, Steve Khan – guitar
Jeff Berlin, Will Lee, Chuck Rainey – bass
Steve Gadd, Andy Newmark – drums
Ralph MacDonald – percussion
Vivian Cherry, Frank Floyd, Gwen Guthrie, Zachary Sanders – background vocals
Harry Cykman, Max Ellen, Barry Finclair, Paul Gershman, Harry Glickman, Emanuel Green, Harold Kohon, Harry Lookofsky, Guy Lumia, Joe Malin, David Nadien, Max Pollikoff, Matthew Raimondi, Richard Sortomme – violin
Al Brown, Ted Israel, Manny Vardi – viola
Charles McCracken, Alan Shulman – cello
Chuck Israels – arco bass
Gloria Agostini - harp
David Matthews – arranger
Bob James - conductor
Technical
Alan Varner, Joe Jorgensen, Rudy Van Gelder - engineer
Pete Turner - front cover photography

References

CTI Records albums
Patti Austin albums
1976 debut albums
Albums arranged by David Matthews (keyboardist)
Albums produced by Creed Taylor
Albums recorded at Van Gelder Studio